Floyd Central High School (FCHS) is a secondary school located in Floyd County, Kentucky, United States, that opened in September 2017. The high school is a consolidation of Allen Central High School and South Floyd High School. The school mascot is Jaguars.  School colors are Kentucky Teal, Black, and Gold.

Academics
Along with the standard curriculum, FCHS will also offer online college courses, AP & dual credit courses.

JROTC
Keeping with decade old tradition that Allen Central High School had, FCHS will have their own JROTC unit.

Sports
The Jaguars will compete in the 15th Region, 58th District in basketball, baseball, volleyball and softball.  The football team will be aligned in Class 3A, District 6.  Floyd Central also has golf, cheer leading, archery and also will be having a bass fishing team.  In their first year in the Floyd County Conference, the golf team won the championship.  In the first ever football game, the Jags beat Harlan High School.

See also
 List of high schools in Kentucky

References 

Educational institutions established in 2017
2017 establishments in Kentucky
Schools in Floyd County, Kentucky
Public high schools in Kentucky